Ali Siddiq (born c. 1973) is an American stand-up comedian, public speaker, and writer based in Houston, Texas.

In 2013 Comedy Central named him the "#1 Comic to Watch". In 2019 he was a finalist on NBC’s comedy competition show Bring the Funny.

Early life

Siddiq was born in Houston. After his parents' separation, Siddiq and his siblings were raised by their single mother, living for a time in the projects. He and his siblings also went on to live with other family members. Siddiq started selling drugs around the age of 14 and was imprisoned at the age of 19 for trafficking in cocaine. He served 6 years of a 15 year sentence in the Ruben M. Torres Unit in Hondo, Texas. It was during his incarceration, while telling jokes to fellow inmates, that he discovered his ability to make people laugh. He worked in the prison's laundromat and his workmates were his captive audience.

After his release from prison in 1997, Siddiq started doing stand-up at the Just Joking Comedy Cafe in Houston. His first stage appearance was during the comedy club's Apollo Night, which tended to attract a college crowd. Siddiq was booed on his first occasion on stage because he was wearing a suit. He decided to wait a couple of weeks before trying again while wearing jeans and a t-shirt. Siddiq became the co-host of the Apollo Night show a month later.

Career
Siddiq's stand-up comedy tends to be in the storytelling style, versus the more common setup/punch-line style. Siddiq's sets involve stories from his personal life, as well his observations on current events, race and politics.

Siddiq's first television appearance was in 2008 on HBO's Def Comedy Jam.  In 2012 he appeared on BET's Comic View and also appeared at the Just for Laughs comedy festival in Montreal. In 2013 he was named Comedy Central's "#1 Comic to Watch".

In 2015 he appeared on the Comedy Central web and television series This is Not Happening and told his story of a prison riot where he learned the meaning of the phrase "Mexican got on boots!" The video of this story received 12 million hits on YouTube. Siddiq also appeared on AXS TV's Gotham Comedy Live (filmed at the Gotham Comedy Club) that same year. In 2016 he released his first half hour special on Comedy Central. 
 
In 2017 he began production on his one-hour special Ali Siddiq: It’s Bigger Than These Bars, which was filmed at the Bell County Jail in Belton, Texas. Released on Comedy Central in 2018, Siddiq can be seen performing in front of a group of inmates interspersed with scenes of him sitting down with smaller groups of incarcerated men and women in their cells, as well as with prison administrators.

In 2019 Siddiq appeared on D.L. Hughley's late night talk show The D.L. Hughley Show, as well as the Comedy Central series This Week at the Comedy Cellar, in addition to being a finalist on the NBC comedy competition series Bring the Funny.

Siddiq has released five comedy albums: Talking Loud Saying Something (Live at the Improv) released in 2010; Enjoy Your Life and Freedom of Speech, which were both released in 2013; Damaged Goods released in 2016 and The Prison Manual released in 2019.

In January 2021, Siddiq joined the Funky Larry Jones afternoon drive show on KMJQ (102.1 FM) in Houston.

Discography
 Talking Loud, Saying Something (2010)
 Freedom of Speech (Aug. 5, 2013)
 Enjoy Your Life (Aug. 18, 2013)
 Damaged Goods (2016)
 It's Bigger Than These Bars (Aug. 2019)
 The Prison Manual (Sep. 2019)

Philanthropy

Since 2009 Siddiq has hosted the annual Jive Turkeys Comedy Show to raise money for the Houston Food Bank. The show is performed each November close to Thanksgiving.

In 2017 he organized and performed at a benefit for Houstonians affected by Hurricane Harvey. In 2018 Siddiq also performed at an annual benefit held by Saba Homes, an orphanage organization created to help orphans of the 2005 Kashmir earthquake in Pakistan.

Siddiq has also volunteered for Harris County’s Juvenile Justice Alternative Education Program.

References

External links
 
 

Living people
Writers from Houston
African-American stand-up comedians
American stand-up comedians
20th-century American comedians
21st-century American comedians
Muslim male comedians
Year of birth missing (living people)
20th-century African-American people
21st-century African-American people